Cause Co-Motion! were an indie/punk/post-punk band from Brooklyn, New York.

History 
New York City quartet Cause Co-Motion! were formed in the mid-2000s by vocalist/guitarist Arno, lead guitarist Alex, drummer Jock and bass player Liam. The band's brand of high energy, lo-fi post-punk influenced pop owed much to bands like the Pastels, Television Personalities, and Wire, while managing to sound very of the moment and not in thrall to their influences. The group began recording and releasing a string of 7-inch singles for small labels like Can't Cope!, Cape Shok, and What's Your Rupture? as well as appearing on compilations, most notably the What's Your Rupture? label sampler alongside kindred spirits Comet Gain and Love Is All. In 2008, the group hooked up with Slumberland and released the I Lie Awake EP. The label followed soon after with the singles collection It's Time!, which rounded up 14 songs that served as an excellent introduction to the band.

Discography

EPs

Albums

References

Indie rock musical groups from New York (state)
Musical groups from Brooklyn